Daphnella areolata is a species of sea snail, a marine gastropod mollusc in the family Raphitomidae.

Description
The length of the shell varies between 9 mm and 12 mm.

Distribution
This marine species occurs off Aliguay Island, Philippines

References

 Stahlschmidt P., Poppe G.T. & Chino M. (2014) Description of seven new Daphnella species from the Philippines (Gastropoda: Raphitomidae). Visaya 4(2): 29-38. [May 2014] page(s): 31.

External links
 Gastropods.com: Daphnella areolata

areolata
Gastropods described in 2014